The Perez Family (Spanish: La familia Pérez) is a 1949 Mexican comedy drama film directed by Gilberto Martínez Solares and starring Joaquín Pardavé, Sara García and Manuel Fábregas. This film could have been inspired by Jane Austen's novel Pride and Prejudice.

Cast
Joaquín Pardavé - Gumaro Pérez
Sara García - Natalia Vivanco de Pérez
Manuel Fábregas - Luis Robles del Valle
Beatriz Aguirre - Clara
José Elías Moreno - Toribio Sánchez
Alma Rosa Aguirre - Patricia
Lilia Prado - Rosa
Felipe de Alba - Roberto Martínez
Conchita Carracedo - Margarita
José Baviera- Don Ricardo
Ana María Villaseñor - Irene
Óscar Pulido - Raymundo
Celia Duarte - Petra
Isaac Norton - Ramón
Eduardo Noriega - Felipe Barrera y Arévalo
José Ángel Espinosa 'Ferrusquilla' - Narrator
Jorge Fábregas - (uncredited)
Gloria Lozano - Empleada en oficina (uncredited)
Paco Martínez - Invitado a boda (uncredited)
Carlos Múzquiz	- Rodríguez (uncredited)
Manuel Trejo - (uncredited)
Hernán Vera - Movedor (uncredited)
Oscar Villela - (uncredited)

External links
 

1949 films
1940s Spanish-language films
Mexican comedy-drama films
Films directed by Gilberto Martínez Solares
Films set in Mexico City
Mexican black-and-white films
Films scored by Manuel Esperón
1949 comedy-drama films
1940s Mexican films